is a railway station in Shinagawa, Tokyo, Japan, operated by the private railway operator Keikyu Corporation. It has the station number "KK03".

Lines
Keikyu
Main Line

Layout
Shimbamba Station is an elevated station with two side platforms serving two tracks. Although the station is long enough to handle 12-car trains, only 4 and 6-car local trains stop at this station.

Platforms

History 
The station opened as an elevated station on October 15, 1976, and replaced the earlier Kitabamba Station and Minamibamba Station. Since the work to elevate and integrate the stations progressed track by track, the two stations had shared one elevated platform for Uraga-bound trains from August 27, 1975 with the transitional station name "Kitabamba·Minamibamba."

Keikyu introduced station numbering to its stations on 21 October 2010; Kitabamba was assigned station number KK03.

Surrounding area 

 Kitashinagawa Onsen Tenjin Yu

References

External links

  

Railway stations in Japan opened in 1904
Railway stations in Tokyo